Ana Siafa (née Nemaia) is a former New Zealand rugby union player. She played Prop for New Zealand and Ponsonby. She started in the Black Ferns historic match against the California Grizzlies at Christchurch in 1989.

References 

Living people
New Zealand female rugby union players
New Zealand women's international rugby union players
Year of birth missing (living people)